Mannez Quarry is a station on the Alderney Railway, in the island of Alderney.

External links
Railway’s website

Railway stations in Alderney